Matthew Burton Brown (born January 10, 1981) is an American mixed martial artist currently competing in the Welterweight division of the Ultimate Fighting Championship. A professional competitor since 2004, Brown was a contestant on the seventh season of The Ultimate Fighter television series.

Background
Brown was born and raised in Jamestown, Ohio. After being home schooled for two years, he attended Greeneview High School, where he struggled to fit in. Living in a small town with no foreseeable future outside of a low paying factory job as a machinist, Brown grew frustrated and turned to drugs and alcohol. For a period, he was addicted to meth, regularly used cocaine and would often get into fights at parties. By his early twenties he had survived a heroin overdose (which led to his nickname "The Immortal"), had been homeless and had been to prison. Brown's interest in MMA started with drunkenly practicing various submission holds that he had seen on VHS tapes featuring Ken Shamrock on friends.

In what started as a cocaine-fueled trip to see his friend fight, Brown signed up to his first fight on a few hours' notice. He purchased a mouth piece from across the road, boiled it in a nearby restaurant and fought his first fight without any training; despite this he ended up winning. Brown fought again in the same night and was beaten badly, losing a decision. His first formal training was at a Japanese jiu-jitsu gym, where he agreed to another fight in two weeks with Muay Thai rules. In what was actually a sanshou match, Brown wound up losing by decision and went to work the same night. He later transitioned to a Jorge Gurgel affiliate, which led him to full MMA training.

Mixed martial arts career

Early career
After compiling an amateur record of 2–0, Brown made his professional MMA debut in the fall of 2005, winning via submission.

On February 9, 2007, in Kennesaw, Georgia, Matt Brown won the ISCF (International Sport Combat Federation) East Coast Welterweight Championship over Douglas Lima by referee stoppage due to strikes at 2:50 of the second round.

Brown thought his career was over due to money problems, yet The Ultimate Fighter trials came along and he was selected to be on the show. He then began splitting time training with Matt Hume in Seattle, Washington and at Throwdown Training Center in Las Vegas, Nevada.

The Ultimate Fighter
Brown was chosen as one of the thirty-two fighters to get a chance at a six-figure UFC contract in The Ultimate Fighter: Team Rampage vs. Team Forrest. He officially entered the show after defeating Josh Hall by TKO in the preliminary round. Brown moved on to the quarter finals by defeating Jeremy May in the first round via head kick KO. He faced eventual winner Amir Sadollah in the quarter-finals but lost by triangle choke in the second round.

Ultimate Fighting Championship
Brown won his UFC debut at The Ultimate Finale 7 by defeating Matt Arroyo, a season six contestant, via second-round TKO. The fight was a rematch from their 2007 fight, which Brown took on a few hours' notice and also won via TKO.

Brown lost his second fight in the organization by split decision to Korean Dong Hyun Kim at UFC 88. Kim threatened Brown with a rear-naked choke from back control in the first round, but became exhausted in the second round. In the third, Kim used some effective ground-and-pound and cut Brown with an elbow. All three judges scored the bout 29–28, two of them in Kim's favor and one in Brown's favor. The decision was contested by the partisan American crowd in attendance with noticeable booing. Commentator Joe Rogan announced during the post-fight interviews that he believed Brown had won the fight.

After Matthew Riddle sustained a knee injury during training, Brown replaced him at UFC 91 and fought Ryan Thomas. Brown won by armbar in the second round.

Brown next fought at UFC 96 on March 7, 2009, in which he fought Pete Sell. Brown defeated Sell via TKO in the first round.

Brown was scheduled to fight on the TUF 9 Finale card against Anthony Johnson. However, Johnson pulled out of the fight after injuring his knee during practice. The UFC set out to find a replacement for Johnson but Brown pulled out as well, to heal up some nagging injuries.

Brown faced James Wilks at UFC 105, defeating him via TKO in the third round. Brown landed a flying knee during the second round that knocked Wilks to the canvas and in the third round, Brown escaped a near fight ending submission attempt by Wilks to take top position. After obtaining full mount, Brown landed multiple unanswered strikes, causing the referee to stop the fight, awarding Brown his third straight UFC win and taking his overall UFC record to 4–1.

During a radio interview held by MMAWeekly, Brown stated he would like to fight Renzo Gracie for his next fight. Instead, Brown faced Ricardo Almeida on March 27, 2010, at UFC 111. Brown lost the fight by rear-naked choke in the second round.

Brown had a rematch with Chris Lytle on July 3, 2010, at UFC 116. He lost the fight via submission in the second round.

Brown was expected to face Canadian Rory MacDonald on November 20, 2010, at UFC 123. However, MacDonald withdrew from the card with an injury and replaced by Brian Foster, who defeated Brown by submission (guillotine choke) in the second round of their bout. After his third consecutive loss, it was announced on ESPN's "MMA Live" that Brown had been released from the promotion. However, Ariel Helwani announced that Brown had in fact not been released from the UFC, citing his source as the UFC itself.

Brown was expected to face Mark Scanlon on March 3, 2011, at UFC Live: Sanchez vs. Kampmann.  However, Scanlon was forced off the card  and replaced by Matthew Riddle. Not long after the Riddle-Brown announcement was made, it was announced that Riddle had been pulled from the fight.

Brown was expected to face Rich Attonito on June 26, 2011, at UFC on Versus 4. However, main card participant Martin Kampmann was forced out of his bout with John Howard with an injury and Brown was chosen as his replacement, while Attonito faced Daniel Roberts. Brown won the fight against Howard via unanimous decision (29–28, 29–28, and 29–28).

Brown was expected to face British fighter John Hathaway on November 5, 2011, at UFC 138, replacing an injured Pascal Krauss. However, John Hathaway was forced to pull out of the bout due to an undisclosed injury and Brown was pulled from the event. Instead Brown faced Seth Baczynski on November 19, 2011, at UFC 139. He lost the fight via submission in the second round.

Brown fought Chris Cope on February 4, 2012, at UFC 143. Brown won the fight via TKO in the second round.

Brown fought prospect Stephen Thompson on April 21, 2012, at UFC 145. Brown handed Thompson his first professional loss via unanimous decision (30–27, 29–27, and 30–27).

Brown faced Luis Ramos on June 22, 2012, at UFC on FX: Maynard vs. Guida, replacing an injured Matthew Riddle. Brown earned his third straight victory with a second-round TKO over Ramos.

Brown next faced Mike Swick on December 8, 2012, at UFC on Fox 5. Despite being a slight underdog, Brown dominated on the ground in the first round, threatening with D'arce and triangle chokes. He eventually won the fight via knockout in the second round, capping a 4-0 year for Brown in 2012.

Brown was expected to face Dan Hardy on April 20, 2013, at UFC on Fox 7.  However, Hardy was forced out of the bout with an injury and replaced by Jordan Mein. Brown won via TKO due to punches and elbows to the body in the second round, the win also earned him his first Fight of the Night bonus award.

Brown was expected to face Thiago Alves on August 17, 2013, at UFC Fight Night 26.  However, Alves pulled out of the bout citing an injury and was replaced by Mike Pyle. Brown won via knockout due to punches in twenty nine seconds of round one.  The win also earned Brown his first Knockout of the Night bonus award.

Brown was expected to face former WEC Welterweight Champion Carlos Condit on December 14, 2013, at UFC on Fox 9. However, in the week leading up to the event, Brown pulled out of the bout citing a back injury.  As a result, Condit was removed from the card as well.

Brown faced Brazilian Erick Silva in his main-event debut at UFC Fight Night 40. After surviving a gruelling start of the first round, in which Silva dropped him with a body kick and almost caught him in a rear-naked choke, Brown came to win the fight via TKO due to punches in the third round. The win also earned Brown an extra $100,000 as he received both a Fight of the Night and a Performance of the Night bonus award.

Brown faced Robbie Lawler in a 5-round Welterweight title eliminator bout on July 26, 2014, at UFC on Fox 12. He lost the bout via unanimous decision. Brown received a bonus award for Fight of the Night.

A bout with Tarec Saffiedine was expected to take place on February 14, 2015, at UFC Fight Night 60. However, it was announced on January 1, 2015, that Saffiedine had pulled out of the bout, citing a groin injury.  Subsequently, Brown was pulled from the event altogether.

Brown was then rescheduled to face Johny Hendricks on March 14, 2015, at UFC 185.  Hendricks won the one sided fight via unanimous decision.

Brown was briefly linked to a bout with Nate Diaz on July 11, 2015, at UFC 189.  However, in mid-April, Brown announced that the pairing had been scrapped.  Brown instead faced Tim Means on the card.  He won the fight via submission in the first round.

Brown was expected to face Kelvin Gastelum on November 21, 2015, at The Ultimate Fighter Latin America 2 Finale. However, Brown withdrew from the fight in early November citing an ankle injury. He was replaced by Neil Magny.

Brown next faced Demian Maia on May 14, 2016, at UFC 198. He lost the fight via submission in the third round.

As the first fight of his new, eight-fight contract Brown faced Jake Ellenberger on July 30, 2016, at UFC 201. He lost the fight via TKO early in the first round.

A pairing with Tarec Saffiedine was rescheduled and was expected to take place on 30 December 2016 at UFC 207. However, Brown was pulled from the fight on November 11 in favor of a matchup with Donald Cerrone three weeks earlier at UFC 206. He lost the fight via knockout in the third round.

Brown faced Diego Sanchez on November 11, 2017, at UFC Fight Night: Poirier vs. Pettis. Brown connected with a brutal elbow strike that knocked Sanchez out cold, winning the fight by knockout in round one. This win also earned him a Performance of the Night bonus award.

Brown was expected to face Carlos Condit on April 14, 2018, at UFC on Fox 29. However, he was pulled out from the fight due to a torn anterior cruciate ligament (ACL).

After one year rehabilitating his injury from torn ACL, Brown returned to face Ben Saunders on December 14, 2019, at UFC 245. He won the fight via knockout in the second round.

Brown was scheduled to face Miguel Baeza on March 28, 2020, at UFC on ESPN: Ngannou vs. Rozenstruik. Due to the COVID-19 pandemic, the event was eventually postponed and the bout has moved to May 16, 2020, at UFC on ESPN: Overeem vs. Harris. Despite knocking Baeza down in the first round, Brown lost the bout via second-round knockout.

Brown faced Carlos Condit on January 16, 2021, at UFC on ABC 1. He lost the fight via unanimous decision.

Brown faced Dhiego Lima on June 19, 2021, at UFC on ESPN 25. He won the fight by knockout in the second round. This fight earned him the Performance of the Night award.

Brown was scheduled to face Bryan Barberena on December 4, 2021, at UFC on ESPN 31.  However, Brown forced out of the bout due to testing positive for COVID-19. The bout against Brown was rescheduled and eventually took place on March 26, 2022, at UFC on ESPN 33. Brown lost the back-and-forth bout via split decision. The fight was awarded the Fight of the Night award.

Brown is scheduled to face Court McGee at UFC Fight Night 224 on May 13, 2023.

Personal life
Matt Brown is the owner of Immortal Martial Arts Center and the Co-founder and Co-owner of Immortal Coffee.

Before fighting professionally, Brown was a personal trainer.

Brown is an avid heavy metal fan, and was in the crowd when former Pantera guitarist Dimebag Darrell was murdered on stage while performing with his new band Damageplan on December 8, 2004. Brown approached heavy metal vocalist Jamey Jasta of the band Hatebreed to write his UFC entrance theme song.  The song, titled "The Immortal", was released on iTunes on March 10, 2015.

Brown also appears on The Great MMA Debate podcast alongside Mark Coleman, Damon Martin, and Jeremy Loper.

On the morning of May 15, 2016, in Curitiba, Brazil, Brown was attacked in public by his former jiu-jitsu coach Rodrigo Botti. The assault began in the hotel lobby where Brown was staying, and escalated outside where it was witnessed by a number of bystanders. The attack was captured on video and Botti was detained by another man until the police arrived at the scene.

After his fight with Jake Ellenberger, Brown recalled having serious post-concussion symptoms, often slurring speech and having trouble with short-term memory. His wife, Colleen Brown, has also stated that Matt's memory is "not as sharp as it once was". He stated he has doubts continuing to fight due to his concussion. Months later he was knocked out by Donald Cerrone via headkick.

Brown's moniker, "The Immortal", was coined by his friends after his drug overdose and near death experience.

Championships and accomplishments
Ultimate Fighting Championship
Fight of the Night (Four Times) 
Knockout of the Night (One time) 
Performance of the Night (Three times) 
Most knockouts in UFC Welterweight history (12)
Tied (with Vitor Belfort) for second most knockouts in UFC history (12)
Most finishes in UFC Welterweight history (14)
Tied (Neil Magny) for most bouts in UFC Welterweight history (29)
International Sport Combat Federation
ISCF East Coast Welterweight Championship (one time)
MMAJunkie.com
2014 May Fight of the Month vs. Erick Silva
Sherdog
 2012 All-Violence First Team
 2013 All-Violence First Team
Bloody Elbow
 2017 Best Knockout of the Year

Mixed martial arts record

|-
|Loss
|align=center|23–19
|Bryan Barberena
|Decision (split)
|UFC on ESPN: Blaydes vs. Daukaus
|
|align=center|3
|align=center|5:00
|Columbus, Ohio, United States
|
|-
|Win
|align=center|23–18
|Dhiego Lima
|KO (punch)
|UFC on ESPN: The Korean Zombie vs. Ige 
|
|align=center|2
|align=center|3:02
|Las Vegas, Nevada, United States
|
|-
|Loss
|align=center|22–18
|Carlos Condit
|Decision (unanimous)
|UFC on ABC: Holloway vs. Kattar
|
|align=center|3
|align=center|5:00
|Abu Dhabi, United Arab Emirates
|
|-
|Loss
|align=center|22–17
|Miguel Baeza
|TKO (punches)
|UFC on ESPN: Overeem vs. Harris
|
|align=center|2
|align=center|0:18
|Jacksonville, Florida, United States
|
|-
|Win
|align=center|22–16
|Ben Saunders
|KO (elbows and punches)
|UFC 245 
|
|align=center|2
|align=center|4:55
|Las Vegas, Nevada, United States
|
|-
|Win
|align=center|21–16
|Diego Sanchez
|KO (elbow)
|UFC Fight Night: Poirier vs. Pettis
|
|align=center|1
|align=center|3:44
|Norfolk, Virginia, United States
|
|-
|Loss
|align=center|20–16
|Donald Cerrone
|KO (head kick)
|UFC 206
|
|align=center|3
|align=center|0:44
|Toronto, Ontario, Canada
| 
|-
|Loss
|align=center|20–15
|Jake Ellenberger
|TKO (kick to the body and punches)
|UFC 201
|
|align=center|1
|align=center|1:46
|Atlanta, Georgia, United States
| 
|-
|Loss
|align=center|20–14
|Demian Maia
|Submission (rear-naked choke)
|UFC 198
|
|align=center|3
|align=center|4:31
|Curitiba, Brazil
|
|-
|Win
|align=center|20–13
|Tim Means
|Submission (guillotine choke)
|UFC 189
|
|align=center|1
|align=center|4:44
|Las Vegas, Nevada, United States
|
|-
|Loss
|align=center|19–13
|Johny Hendricks
|Decision (unanimous)
|UFC 185
|
|align=center|3
|align=center|5:00
|Dallas, Texas, United States
|
|-
|Loss
|align=center|19–12
|Robbie Lawler
| Decision (unanimous)
| UFC on Fox: Lawler vs. Brown
| 
| align=center|5
| align=center|5:00
|San Jose, California, United States
|
|-
|Win
|align=center|19–11
|Erick Silva
|TKO (punches)
|UFC Fight Night: Brown vs. Silva
|
|align=center|3
|align=center|2:11
|Cincinnati, Ohio, United States
|
|-
|Win
|align=center|18–11
|Mike Pyle
|KO (punches)
|UFC Fight Night: Shogun vs. Sonnen
|
|align=center|1
|align=center|0:29
|Boston, Massachusetts, United States
|
|-
|Win
|align=center|17–11
|Jordan Mein
|TKO (elbows)
|UFC on Fox: Henderson vs. Melendez
|
|align=center|2
|align=center|1:00
|San Jose, California, United States
|
|-
|Win
|align=center|16–11
|Mike Swick
|KO (punches)
|UFC on Fox: Henderson vs. Diaz
|
|align=center|2
|align=center|2:31
|Seattle, Washington, United States
|
|-
|Win
|align=center|15–11
|Luis Ramos
|TKO (knees and punches)
|UFC on FX: Maynard vs. Guida
|
|align=center|2
|align=center|4:20
|Atlantic City, New Jersey, United States
|
|-
|Win
|align=center|14–11
|Stephen Thompson
|Decision (unanimous)
|UFC 145
|
|align=center|3
|align=center|5:00
|Atlanta, Georgia, United States
|
|-
|Win
|align=center|13–11
|Chris Cope
|TKO (punches)
|UFC 143
|
|align=center|2
|align=center|1:19
|Las Vegas, Nevada, United States
|
|-
|Loss
|align=center|12–11
|Seth Baczynski
|Submission (guillotine choke)
|UFC 139
|
|align=center|2
|align=center|0:42
|San Jose, California, United States
|
|-
|Win
|align=center|12–10
|John Howard
|Decision (unanimous)
|UFC Live: Kongo vs. Barry
|
|align=center|3
|align=center|5:00
|Pittsburgh, Pennsylvania, United States
|
|-
|Loss
|align=center|11–10
|Brian Foster
|Submission (guillotine choke)
|UFC 123
|
|align=center|2
|align=center|2:11
|Auburn Hills, Michigan, United States
|
|-
|Loss
|align=center|11–9
|Chris Lytle
|Submission (straight armbar)
|UFC 116
|
|align=center|2
|align=center|2:02
|Las Vegas, Nevada, United States
|
|-
|Loss
|align=center|11–8
|Ricardo Almeida
|Submission (rear-naked choke)
|UFC 111
|
|align=center|2
|align=center|3:30
|Newark, New Jersey, United States
|
|-
|Win
|align=center|11–7
|James Wilks
|TKO (punches)
|UFC 105
|
|align=center|3
|align=center|2:27
|Manchester, England
|
|-
|Win
|align=center|10–7
|Pete Sell
|TKO (punches)
|UFC 96
|
|align=center|1
|align=center|1:32
|Columbus, Ohio, United States
|
|-
|Win
|align=center|9–7
|Ryan Thomas
|Submission (armbar)
|UFC 91
|
|align=center|2
|align=center|0:57
|Las Vegas, Nevada, United States
|
|-
|Loss
|align=center|8–7
|Dong Hyun Kim
|Decision (split)
|UFC 88
|
|align=center|3
|align=center|5:00
|Atlanta, Georgia, United States
|
|-
|Win
|align=center|8–6
|Matt Arroyo
|TKO (punches)
|The Ultimate Fighter 7 Finale
|
|align=center|2
|align=center|3:40
|Las Vegas, Nevada, United States
|
|-
|Loss
|align=center|7–6
|Chris Lytle
|Submission (guillotine choke)
|United Fight League
|
|align=center|2
|align=center|2:49
|Indianapolis, Indiana, United States
|
|-
|Win
|align=center|7–5
| Dan Kolbasowski
|Submission (armbar)
|FightFest: Black and Blues Tour
|
|align=center|1
|align=center|1:37
|Cleveland, Ohio, United States
|
|-
|Loss
|align=center|6–5
|Daniel Moraes
|Submission (armbar)
|GFC: Evolution
|
|align=center|1
|align=center|2:32
|Columbus, Ohio, United States
|
|-
|Loss
|align=center|6–4
| Jesse Chilton
|Submission (arm-triangle choke)
|NLF 8
|
|align=center|3
|align=center|3:23
|Steubenville, Ohio, United States
|
|-
|Win
|align=center|6–3
| Douglas Lima
|TKO (punches)
|ISCF: Invasion
|
|align=center|2
|align=center|2:50
|Kennesaw, Georgia, United States
|
|-
|Win
|align=center|5–3
| Matt Arroyo
|TKO (punches)
|Real Fighting Championships
|
|align=center|2
|align=center|2:50
|Tampa, Florida, United States
|
|-
|Win
|align=center|4–3
|Jason Nickoson
|Submission (triangle choke)
|Fightfest 8
|
|align=center|1
|align=center|0:51
|Cleveland, Ohio, United States
|
|-
|Loss
|align=center|3–3
|Chris Liguori
|Submission (rear-naked choke)
|CITC 3: Marked Territory
|
|align=center|2
|align=center|0:42
|Lincroft, New Jersey, United States
|
|-
|Loss
|align=center|3–2
|Mikey Gomez
|Submission (rear-naked choke)
|Absolute Fighting Championships 17
|
|align=center|1
|align=center|3:35
|Boca Raton, Florida, United States
|
|-
|Win
|align=center|3–1
|Brian King
|Submission (armbar)
|Broken Reflection
|
|align=center|1
|align=center|3:27
|Toledo, Ohio, United States
|
|-
|Loss
|align=center|2–1
|Pete Spratt
|Decision (unanimous)
|International Freestyle Fighting 1
|
|align=center|3
|align=center|5:00
|Fort Worth, Texas, United States
|
|-
|Win
|align=center|2–0
|Joey Whitt
|KO (punches)
|GFL: Brawl at the Buckeye
|
|align=center|1
|align=center|0:39
|Columbus, Ohio, United States
|
|-
|Win
|align=center|1–0
|Ricardo Martinez
|Submission (neck crank)
|Higher Power Fighting
|
|align=center|1
|align=center|2:54
|Lancaster, Ohio, United States
|
|-

Mixed martial arts exhibition record

|-
|Loss
|align=center|2–1
|Amir Sadollah
|Submission (triangle choke)
|The Ultimate Fighter: Team Rampage vs. Team Forrest
|  (airdate)
|align=center|2
|align=center|4:09
|Las Vegas, Nevada, United States
|
|-
|Win
|align=center|2–0
|Jeremy May
|KO (head kick)
|The Ultimate Fighter: Team Rampage vs. Team Forrest
|  (airdate)
|align=center|1
|align=center|3:35
|Las Vegas, Nevada, United States
|
|-
|Win
|align=center|1–0
|Josh Hall
|TKO (punches)
|The Ultimate Fighter: Team Rampage vs. Team Forrest
|  (airdate)
|align=center|1
|align=center|4:58
|Las Vegas, Nevada, United States
|
|-

See also
 List of current UFC fighters
 List of male mixed martial artists

References

External links

1981 births
Living people
American male mixed martial artists
Mixed martial artists from Ohio
Welterweight mixed martial artists
Mixed martial artists utilizing Muay Thai
Mixed martial artists utilizing judo
Mixed martial artists utilizing jujutsu
Mixed martial artists utilizing Brazilian jiu-jitsu
American practitioners of Brazilian jiu-jitsu
American male judoka
American jujutsuka
Sportspeople from Xenia, Ohio
American Muay Thai practitioners
Ultimate Fighting Championship male fighters